The Supreme Council of National Defence (Consiliul Suprem de Apărare a Ţării; acronym: CSAT) is the autonomous administrative authority in Romania, invested by the Constitution with the task of organising and coordinating, by unanimous decisions, the activities related to the country's defence and national security.

Control
The activity of the Council is examined by the Parliament. Annually, not later than the first trimester of the following year, if and when asked by the special committees of the Parliament, and also whenever necessary, the Council presents, in a joint session of the Chamber of Deputies and the Senate, its report on activities it has developed.

Leadership and Members
 President of the Council: President of Romania
 Vice President of the Council: Prime Minister of Romania
 Members or the Council:
 Minister of National Defence
 Minister of Internal Affairs
 Minister of Foreign Affairs
 Minister of Justice
 Minister of Economy
 Minister of Public Finance
 Director of the Romanian Intelligence Service
 Director of the Foreign Intelligence Service
 Chief of the General Staff
 Presidential Advisor for National Security
 Secretary of the Supreme Council of National Defence

External links
 Official site

Government of Romania
Romania